KESU-LP (94.9 FM, "K-Iesu Radio 94.9M") is a radio station licensed to serve the community of Lihue, Hawaii. The station is owned by Calvary Chapel Lihue. It airs a Christian radio format.

The station was assigned the KESU-LP call letters by the Federal Communications Commission on April 10, 2015.

References

External links
 Official Website
 FCC Public Inspection File for KESU-LP
 

ESU-LP
Radio stations established in 2015
2015 establishments in Hawaii
ESU-LP
Kauai County, Hawaii